The Jewell Historic District is a  historic district in Jewell, Georgia which was listed on the National Register of Historic Places in 1979.

It includes Late Victorian, Queen Anne, Gothic Revival architecture.  The listing included 37 contributing buildings and four contributing sites.

References

		
National Register of Historic Places in Warren County, Georgia
Gothic Revival architecture in Georgia (U.S. state)
Victorian architecture in Georgia (U.S. state)
Queen Anne architecture in Georgia (U.S. state)
Buildings and structures completed in 1845